|}

This is a list of electoral district results for the Queensland 2001 election.

Results by electoral district

Albert

Algester

Ashgrove

Aspley

Barron River

Beaudesert

Brisbane Central

Broadwater

Bulimba

Bundaberg

Bundamba

Burdekin

Burleigh

Burnett

Cairns

Callide

Caloundra

Capalaba

Charters Towers

Chatsworth

Clayfield

Cleveland

Cook

Cunningham

Currumbin

Darling Downs

Everton

Ferny Grove

Fitzroy

Gaven

Gladstone

Glass House

Greenslopes

Gregory

Gympie

Hervey Bay

Hinchinbrook

Inala

Indooroopilly

Ipswich

Ipswich West

Kallangur

Kawana

Keppel

Kurwongbah

Lockyer

Logan

Lytton

Mackay

Mansfield

Maroochydore

Maryborough

Mirani

Moggill

Mount Coot-tha

Mount Gravatt

Mount Isa

Mount Ommaney

Mudgeeraba

Mulgrave

Mundingburra

Murrumba

Nanango

Nicklin

Noosa

Nudgee

Pumicestone

Redcliffe

Redlands

Robina

Rockhampton

Sandgate

South Brisbane

Southern Downs

Southport

Springwood

Stafford

Stretton

Surfers Paradise

Tablelands

Thuringowa

Toowoomba North

Toowoomba South

Townsville

Warrego

Waterford

Whitsunday

Woodridge

Yeerongpilly

See also 

 2001 Queensland state election
 Candidates of the Queensland state election, 2001
 Members of the Queensland Legislative Assembly, 2001-2004

References 

Results of Queensland elections